Wittedrif is a settlement in Garden Route District Municipality in the Western Cape province of South Africa.

Wittedrif is a semi-rural village 5.5 km from the N2 road and 30km from Knysna.

References

Populated places in the Bitou Local Municipality